Jérémy Mawatu (born 12 August 1997) is a French professional footballer who plays for Pétange.

References

External links 
 
 

1997 births
Living people
French footballers
Association football midfielders
French expatriate footballers
Expatriate footballers in Belarus
Expatriate footballers in Luxembourg
AJ Auxerre players
US Créteil-Lusitanos players
FC Energetik-BGU Minsk players
Football Club 93 Bobigny-Bagnolet-Gagny players
Union Titus Pétange players